The Defence Force School of Music (DFSM) trains all musicians for the Australian Defence Force. It is located at Simpson Barracks in Yallambie, Victoria, Australia. The DFSM was established in 1984 and provides training courses to musicians wishing to join the Royal Australian Navy Band, the Australian Army Band Corps, the Royal Australian Air Force Band, as well as other Australian military bands, in order to qualify them for employment and leadership in these bands. It also offers training to musicians from overseas militaries and Australian emergency services/police organisations. It was previously the divided into the Australian Army School of Music (which was itself part of the Army Apprentices' School) and the Royal Australian Navy School of Music.

Within the DFSM are several training sections:

 Piping Section
 Military Band Section
 Vocal Ensemble
 Fanfare Team
 Woodwind and Brass Quintet
 Big Band
 Other specifications

The level of competence required to be admitted into the DFSM is a Grade 7 by the Australian Music Examinations Board.

Notable personalities
Lieutenant Colonel Patrick Pickett – Commandant of the Defence Force School of Music and later director of music of the AABC.
Graham Lloyd – Chief Instructor at the Defence Force School of Music beginning in February 2004. He was also an instructor at the Army School of Music in 1976, 1977 and 1987.

See also
Australian Army Band Corps
Canadian Forces School of Music
Royal Military School of Music
Irish Defence Forces School of Music

References

External links
Defence Force School of Music

Military education and training in Australia
Australian military bands
Educational institutions established in 1984
1984 establishments in Australia